Tragopogon mirus, the remarkable goatsbeard, is a plant species considered native to certain regions of North America. Intensive studies over the course of many years have demonstrated that it originated as an allopolyploid hybrid between T. dubius and T. porrifolius, both of which are European species naturalized in the US. Tragopogon mirus has become established in the wild, reproducing by its own, thus deserving recognition as a species.

Tragopogon mirus is an herb up to 150 cm (60 inches) tall. Leaves are slightly tomentose when young, nearly glabrous when fully mature. Leaf apices are straight, not curved or coiled as in some other species of the genus. Flower heads are purple to brownish purple with a yellow center.

References

mirus
Flora of Washington (state)
Flora of Idaho
Plants described in 1950
Flora without expected TNC conservation status